The Ulster Senior Club Hurling League is an annual hurling tournament played between a number of clubs administered by Ulster GAA. It is played in the early part of the year and is far less prestigious than the Ulster Senior Club Hurling Championship and many sides see it as a warm-up to their respective county leagues and championships. The current Ulster League holders are Dunloy of Antrim.

Roll of honour

See also
Ulster Senior Club Hurling Championship
Ulster Senior Club Football League

References

Hurling competitions in Ulster
Hurling leagues in Ireland